Stuart Gibbs is a male former international table tennis player from England.

Table tennis career
He represented England at the 1967 World Table Tennis Championships in the Swaythling Cup (men's team event) with Chester Barnes, Denis Neale and Ian Harrison.

He won an English National Table Tennis Championships mixed doubles title in 1967.

See also
 List of England players at the World Team Table Tennis Championships

References

English male table tennis players